The Capitulare missorum generale ("General capitulary on legates") and Capitularia missorum specialia ("Special capitularies on legates"), both issued in 802, were acts of Charlemagne whereby the role and functions of the missi dominici ("royal legates") were defined and placed on a permanent footing, as well as specific instructions sent out to the various missatica (the missi's territories).

Editions

Sources

External links
http://www.fordham.edu/halsall/source/carol-missi1.asp
http://avalon.law.yale.edu/medieval/capitula.asp

Charlemagne
9th century in law
9th-century Latin books
9th-century documents
802
Carolingian Empire